Coyote Gulch is a stream in San Francisco, California. It is one of the last remaining free flowing, unculverted creeks in San Francisco. It runs from the foothills of the Presidio to the Pacific Ocean.

Notes

Rivers of San Francisco
Rivers of Northern California